Daniel Petrovic (born 27 November 1992) is a Serbian footballer. Petrovic plays as a defender.

References

External links
 

1992 births
Footballers from Linz
Living people
Austrian people of Serbian descent
Austrian footballers
Association football defenders
SKN St. Pölten players
SK Vorwärts Steyr players
FC Blau-Weiß Linz players
USK Anif players
FC Juniors OÖ players
Austrian Football Bundesliga players